Beaumont is a city in Leduc County within the Edmonton Metropolitan Region of Alberta, Canada.

Originally a French farming community, Beaumont is now a city with 19,236 people. Its downtown core resembles a French village with unique architecture and red brick walkways. It is named for the "beautiful hill" on which St. Vital Church, built in 1919, is located within the centre of the city.  The name was selected in 1895 as part of a petition for a post office.

History 
Beaumont incorporated as a village on January 1, 1973, and then as a town on January 1, 1980. On January 1, 2019, Beaumont incorporated as a city.

Demographics 

In the 2016 Census of Population conducted by Statistics Canada, Beaumont had a population of 17,396 living in 5,633 of its 5,980 total private dwellings, a  change from its 2011 population of 13,284.

In 2014, 49.6% of the workforce of Beaumont was employed in the nearby city of Edmonton.

Economy 
The City of Beaumont is a member of the Leduc-Nisku Economic Development Association, an economic development partnership that markets Alberta's International Region in proximity to the Edmonton International Airport.

Arts and culture 
Beaumont is home to the Beaumont Blues & Roots Festival (BBRF). Previous performers at the BBRF have included Chantal Kreviazuk, Raine Maida, Corb Lund, Fred Penner, Matt Andersen, Sloan, Powder Blues Band, and the Sheepdogs.

See also 
List of communities in Alberta
List of cities in Alberta
Beaumont Composite High School

References

External links 

1973 establishments in Alberta
Cities in Alberta
Edmonton Metropolitan Region
Leduc County
Populated places established in 1895